Vladimir Semyonovich Vysotsky (25 January 1938 – 25 July 1980), was a Soviet singer-songwriter, poet, and actor who had an immense and enduring effect on Soviet culture. He became widely known for his unique singing style and for his lyrics, which featured social and political commentary in often humorous street-jargon. He was also a prominent stage- and screen-actor. Though the official Soviet cultural establishment largely ignored his work, he was remarkably popular during his lifetime, and to this day exerts significant influence on many of Russia's musicians and actors.

Biography 
Vysotsky was born in Moscow at the 3rd Meshchanskaya St. (61/2) maternity hospital. His father, Semyon Volfovich (Vladimirovich) (1915–1997), was a colonel in the Soviet army, originally from Kiev. Vladimir's mother, Nina Maksimovna, (née Seryogina, 1912–2003) was Russian, and worked as a German language translator. Vysotsky's family lived in a Moscow communal flat in harsh conditions, and had serious financial difficulties. When Vladimir was  old, Nina had to return to her office in the Transcript bureau of the Soviet Ministry of Geodesy and Cartography (engaged in making German maps available for the Soviet military) so as to help her husband earn their family's living.

Vladimir's theatrical inclinations became obvious at an early age, and were supported by his paternal grandmother Dora Bronshteyn, a theater fan. The boy used to recite poems, standing on a chair and "flinging hair backwards, like a real poet," often using in his public speeches expressions he could hardly have heard at home. Once, at the age of two, when he had tired of the family's guests' poetry requests, he, according to his mother, sat himself under the New-year tree with a frustrated air about him and sighed: "You silly tossers! Give a child some respite!" His sense of humor was extraordinary, but often baffling for people around him. A three-year-old could jeer his father in a bathroom with unexpected poetic improvisation ("Now look what's here before us / Our goat's to shave himself!") or appall unwanted guests with some street folk song, promptly steering them away. Vysotsky remembered those first three years of his life in the autobiographical Ballad of Childhood (Баллада о детстве, 1975), one of his best-known songs.

As World War II broke out, Semyon Vysotsky, a military reserve officer, joined the Soviet army and went to fight the Nazis. Nina and Vladimir were evacuated to the village of Vorontsovka, in Orenburg Oblast where the boy had to spend six days a week in a kindergarten and his mother worked for twelve hours a day in a chemical factory. In 1943, both returned to their Moscow apartment at 1st Meschanskaya St., 126. In September 1945, Vladimir joined the 1st class of the 273rd Moscow Rostokino region School.

In December 1946, Vysotsky's parents divorced. From 1947 to 1949, Vladimir lived with Semyon Vladimirovich (then an army Major) and his Armenian wife, Yevgenya Stepanovna Liholatova, whom the boy called "aunt Zhenya", at a military base in Eberswalde in the Soviet-occupied zone of Germany (later East Germany). "We decided that our son would stay with me. Vladimir came to stay with me in January 1947, and my second wife, Yevgenia, became Vladimir's second mother for many years to come. They had much in common and liked each other, which made me really happy," Semyon Vysotsky later remembered. Here living conditions, compared to those of Nina's communal Moscow flat, were infinitely better; the family occupied the whole floor of a two-storeyed house, and the boy had a room to himself for the first time in his life. In 1949 along with his stepmother Vladimir returned to Moscow. In 1953 Vysotsky, now much interested in theater and cinema, joined the Drama courses led by Vladimir Bogomolov. "No one in my family has had anything to do with arts, no actors or directors were there among them. But my mother admired theater and from the earliest age... each and every Saturday I've been taken up with her to watch one play or the other. And all of this, it probably stayed with me," he later reminisced. The same year he received his first ever guitar, a birthday present from Nina Maksimovna; a close friend, bard and a future well-known Soviet pop lyricist Igor Kokhanovsky taught him basic chords. In 1955 Vladimir re-settled into his mother's new home at 1st Meshchanskaya, 76. In June of the same year he graduated from school with five A's.

Professional career
In 1955, Vladimir enrolled into the Moscow State University of Civil Engineering, but dropped out after just one semester to pursue an acting career. In June 1956 he joined Boris Vershilov's class at the Moscow Art Theatre Studio-Institute. It was there that he met the 3rd course student Iza Zhukova who four years later became his wife; soon the two lovers settled at the 1st Meschanskaya flat, in a common room, shielded off by a folding screen. It was also in the Studio that Vysotsky met Bulat Okudzhava for the first time, an already popular underground bard. He was even more impressed by his Russian literature teacher Andrey Sinyavsky who along with his wife often invited students to his home to stage improvised disputes and concerts. In 1958 Vysotsky's got his first Moscow Art Theatre role: that of Porfiry Petrovich in Dostoyevsky's Crime and Punishment. In 1959 he was cast in his first cinema role, that of student Petya in Vasily Ordynsky's The Yearlings (Сверстницы). On 20 June 1960, Vysotsky graduated from the MAT theater institute and joined the Moscow Pushkin Drama Theatre (led by Boris Ravenskikh at the time) where he spent (with intervals) almost three troubled years. These were marred by numerous administrative sanctions, due to "lack of discipline" and occasional drunken sprees which were a reaction, mainly, to the lack of serious roles and his inability to realise his artistic potential. A short stint in 1962 at the Moscow Theater of Miniatures (administered at the time by Vladimir Polyakov) ended with him being fired, officially "for a total lack of sense of humour."

Vysotsky's second and third films, Dima Gorin's Career and 713 Requests Permission to Land, were interesting only for the fact that in both he had to be beaten up (in the first case by Aleksandr Demyanenko). "That was the way cinema greeted me," he later jokingly remarked. In 1961, Vysotsky wrote his first ever proper song, called "Tattoo" (Татуировка), which started a long and colourful cycle of artfully stylized criminal underworld romantic stories, full of undercurrents and witty social comments. In June 1963, while shooting Penalty Kick (directed by Veniamin Dorman and starring Mikhail Pugovkin), Vysotsky used the Gorky Film Studio to record an hour-long reel-to-reel cassette of his own songs; copies of it quickly spread and the author's name became known in Moscow and elsewhere (although many of these songs were often being referred to as either "traditional" or "anonymous"). Just several months later Riga-based chess grandmaster Mikhail Tal was heard praising the author of "Bolshoy Karetny" (Большой Каретный) and Anna Akhmatova (in a conversation with Joseph Brodsky) was quoting Vysotsky's number "I was the soul of a bad company..." taking it apparently for some brilliant piece of anonymous street folklore. In October 1964 Vysotsky recorded in chronological order 48 of his own songs, his first self-made Complete works of... compilation, which boosted his popularity as a new Moscow folk underground star.

1964–1970 

In 1964, director Yuri Lyubimov invited Vysotsky to join the newly created Taganka Theatre. "'I've written some songs of my own. Won't you listen?' – he asked. I agreed to listen to just one of them, expecting our meeting to last for no more than five minutes. Instead I ended up listening to him for an entire 1.5 hours," Lyubimov remembered years later of this first audition. A month later he came on stage as a dragoon captain (Bela's father) in Lermontov's A Hero of Our Time. It was in Taganka that Vysotsky started to sing on stage; the War theme becoming prominent in his musical repertoire. In 1965 Vysotsky appeared in the experimental Poet and Theater (Поэт и Театр, February) show, based on Andrey Voznesensky's work and then Ten Days that Shook the World (after John Reed's book, April) and was commissioned by Lyubimov to write songs exclusively for Taganka's new World War II play. The Fallen and the Living (Павшие и Живые), premiered in October 1965, featured Vysotsky's "Stars" (Звёзды), "The Soldiers of Heeresgruppe Mitte" (Солдаты группы "Центр") and "Penal Battalions" (Штрафные батальоны), the striking examples of a completely new kind of a war song, never heard in his country before. As veteran screenwriter Nikolay Erdman put it (in conversation with Lyubimov), "Professionally, I can well understand how Mayakovsky or Seryozha Yesenin were doing it. How Volodya Vysotsky does it is totally beyond me." With his songs – in effect, miniature theatrical dramatizations (usually with a protagonist and full of dialogues), Vysotsky instantly achieved such level of credibility that real life former prisoners, war veterans, boxers, footballers refused to believe that the author himself had never served his time in prisons and labor camps, or fought in the War, or been a boxing/football professional. After the second of the two concerts at the Leningrad Molecular Physics institute (that was his actual debut as a solo musical performer) Vysotsky left a note for his fans in a journal which ended with words: "Now that you've heard all these songs, please, don't you make a mistake of mixing me with my characters, I am not like them at all. With love, Vysotsky, 20 April 1965, XX c." Excuses of this kind he had to make throughout his performing career. At least one of Vysotsky's song themes – that of alcoholic abuse – was worryingly autobiographical, though. By the time his breakthrough came in 1967, he'd suffered several physical breakdowns and once was sent (by Taganka's boss) to a rehabilitation clinic, a visit he on several occasions repeated since.

Brecht's Life of Galileo (premiered on 17 May 1966), transformed by Lyubimov into a powerful allegory of Soviet intelligentsia's set of moral and intellectual dilemmas, brought Vysotsky his first leading theater role (along with some fitness lessons: he had to perform numerous acrobatic tricks on stage). Press reaction was mixed, some reviewers disliked the actor's overt emotionalism, but it was for the first time ever that Vysotsky's name appeared in Soviet papers. Film directors now were treating him with respect. Viktor Turov's war film I Come from the Childhood where Vysotsky got his first ever "serious" (neither comical, nor villainous) role in cinema, featured two of his songs: a spontaneous piece called "When It's Cold" (Холода) and a dark, Unknown soldier theme-inspired classic "Common Graves" (На братских могилах), sung behind the screen by the legendary Mark Bernes.

Stanislav Govorukhin and Boris Durov's The Vertical (1967), a mountain climbing drama, starring Vysotsky (as Volodya the radioman), brought him all-round recognition and fame. Four of the numbers used in the film (including "" (Песня о друге), released in 1968 by the Soviet recording industry monopolist Melodiya disc to become an unofficial hit) were written literally on the spot, nearby Elbrus, inspired by professional climbers' tales and one curious hotel bar conversation with a German guest who 25 years ago happened to climb these very mountains in a capacity of an Edelweiss division fighter. Another 1967 film, Kira Muratova's Brief Encounters featured Vysotsky as the geologist Maxim (paste-bearded again) with a now trademark off-the-cuff musical piece, a melancholy improvisation called "Things to Do" (Дела). All the while Vysotsky continued working hard at Taganka, with another important role under his belt (that of Mayakovsky or, rather one of the latter character's five different versions) in the experimental piece called Listen! (Послушайте!), and now regularly gave semi-official concerts where audiences greeted him as a cult hero.

"He put into his performance all the things that he excelled at and, on the other hand, it was Pugachyov that made him discover his own potential," – Soviet critic Natalya Krymova wrote years later. Several weeks after the premiere, infuriated by the actor's increasing unreliability triggered by worsening drinking problems, Lyubimov fired him – only to let him back again several months later (and thus begin the humiliating sacked-then-pardoned routine which continued for years). In June 1968 a Vysotsky-slagging campaign was launched in the Soviet press. First Sovetskaya Rossiya commented on the "epidemic spread of immoral, smutty songs," allegedly promoting "criminal world values, alcoholism, vice and immorality" and condemned their author for "sowing seeds of evil." Then Komsomolskaya Pravda linked Vysotsky with black market dealers selling his tapes somewhere in Siberia. Composer Dmitry Kabalevsky speaking from the Union of Soviet Composers' Committee tribune criticised the Soviet radio for giving an ideologically dubious, "low-life product" like "Song of a Friend" (Песня о друге) an unwarranted airplay. Playwright Alexander Stein who in his Last Parade play used several of Vysotsky's songs, was chastised by a Ministry of Culture official for "providing a tribune for this anti-Soviet scum." The phraseology prompted commentators in the West to make parallels between Vysotsky and Mikhail Zoschenko, another Soviet author who'd been officially labeled "scum" some 20 years ago.

Two of Vysotsky's 1968 films, Gennady Poloka's Intervention (premiered in May 1987) where he was cast as Brodsky, a dodgy even if highly artistic character, and Yevgeny Karelov's Two Comrades Were Serving (a gun-toting White Army officer Brusentsov who in the course of the film shoots his friend, his horse, Oleg Yankovsky's good guy character and, finally himself) – were severely censored, first of them shelved for twenty years. At least four of Vysotsky's 1968 songs, "Save Our Souls" (Спасите наши души), "The Wolfhunt" (Охота на волков), "Gypsy Variations" (Моя цыганская) and "The Steam-bath in White" (Банька по-белому), were hailed later as masterpieces. It was at this point that 'proper' love songs started to appear in Vysotsky's repertoire, documenting the beginning of his passionate love affair with French actress Marina Vlady.

In 1969 Vysotsky starred in two films: The Master of Taiga where he played a villainous Siberian timber-floating brigadier, and more entertaining Dangerous Tour. The latter was criticized in the Soviet press for taking a farcical approach to the subject of the Bolshevik underground activities but for a wider Soviet audience this was an important opportunity to enjoy the charismatic actor's presence on big screen. In 1970, after visiting the dislodged Soviet leader Nikita Khrushchev at his dacha and having a lengthy conversation with him, Vysotsky embarked on a massive and by Soviet standards dangerously commercial concert tour in Soviet Central Asia and then brought Marina Vlady to director Viktor Turov's place so as to investigate her Belarusian roots. The pair finally wed on 1 December 1970 (causing furore among the Moscow cultural and political elite) and spent a honeymoon in Georgia. This was the highly productive period for Vysotsky, resulting in numerous new songs, including the anthemic "I Hate" (Я не люблю), sentimental "Lyricale" (Лирическая) and dramatic war epics "He Didn't Return from the Battle" (Он не вернулся из боя) and "The Earth Song" (Песня о Земле) among many others.

1971–1973 
By this time he has been suffering from alcoholism. Many of his songs from this period deal, either directly or metaphorically, with alcoholism and insanity. Partially recovered (due to the encouraging presence of Marina Vladi), Vysotsky embarked on a successful Ukrainian concert tour and wrote a cluster of new songs. On 29 November 1971 Taganka's Hamlet premiered, a groundbreaking Lyubimov's production with Vysotsky in the leading role, that of a lone intellectual rebel, rising to fight the cruel state machine.

Also in 1971 Vysotsky was invited to play the lead in The Sannikov Land, the screen adaptation of Vladimir Obruchev's science fiction, which he wrote several songs for, but was suddenly dropped for the reason of his face "being too scandalously recognisable" as a state official put it. One of the songs written for the film, a doom-laden epic allegory "Capricious Horses" (Кони привередливые), became one of the singer's signature tunes. Two of Vysotsky's 1972 film roles were somewhat meditative: an anonymous American journalist in The Fourth One and the "righteous guy" von Koren in The Bad Good Man (based on Anton Chekov's Duel). The latter brought Vysotsky the Best Male Role prize at the V Taormina Film Fest. This philosophical slant rubbed off onto some of his new works of the time: "A Singer at the Microphone" (Певец у микрофона), "The Tightrope Walker" (Канатоходец), two new war songs ("We Spin the Earth", "Black Pea-Coats") and "The Grief" (Беда), a folkish girl's lament, later recorded by Marina Vladi and subsequently covered by several female performers. Popular proved to be his 1972 humorous songs: "Mishka Shifman" (Мишка Шифман), satirizing the leaving-for-Israel routine, "Victim of the Television" which ridiculed the concept of "political consciousness," and "The Honour of the Chess Crown" (Честь шахматной короны) about an ever-fearless "simple Soviet man" challenging the much feared American champion Bobby Fischer to a match.

In 1972 he stepped up in Soviet Estonian TV where he presented his songs and gave an interview. The name of the show was "Young Man from Taganka" (Noormees Tagankalt).

In April 1973 Vysotsky visited Poland and France. Predictable problems concerning the official permission were sorted after the French Communist Party leader Georges Marchais made a personal phone call to Leonid Brezhnev who, according to Marina Vlady's memoirs, rather sympathized with the stellar couple. Having found on return a potentially dangerous lawsuit brought against him (concerning some unsanctioned concerts in Siberia the year before), Vysotsky wrote a defiant letter to the Minister of Culture Pyotr Demichev. As a result, he was granted the status of a philharmonic artist, 11.5 roubles per concert now guaranteed. Still the 900 rubles fine had to be paid according to the court verdict, which was a substantial sum, considering his monthly salary at the theater was 110 rubles. That year Vysotsky wrote some thirty songs for "Alice in Wonderland," an audioplay where he himself has been given several minor roles. His best known songs of 1973 included "The Others' Track" (Чужая колея), "The Flight Interrupted" (Прерванный полёт) and "The Monument", all pondering on his achievements and legacy.

1974–1977
In 1974 Melodiya released the 7" EP, featuring four of Vysotsky's war songs ("He Never Returned From the Battle", "The New Times Song", "Common Graves", and "The Earth Song") which represented a tiny portion of his creative work, owned by millions on tape. In September of that year Vysotsky received his first state award, the Honorary Diploma of the Uzbek SSR following a tour with fellow actors from the Taganka Theatre in Uzbekistan. A year later he was granted the USSR Union of Cinematographers' membership. This meant he was not an "anti-Soviet scum" now, rather an unlikely link between the official Soviet cinema elite and the "progressive-thinking artists of the West." More films followed, among them The Only Road (a Soviet-Yugoslav joint venture, premiered on 10 January 1975 in Belgrade) and a science fiction movie The Flight of Mr. McKinley (1975). Out of nine ballads that he wrote for the latter only two have made it into the soundtrack. This was the height of his popularity, when, as described in Vlady's book about her husband, walking down the street on a summer night, one could hear Vysotsky's recognizable voice coming literally from every open window. Among the songs written at the time, were humorous "The Instruction before the Trip Abroad", lyrical "Of the Dead Pilot" and philosophical "The Strange House".

In 1975 Vysotsky made his third trip to France where he rather riskily visited his former tutor (and now a celebrated dissident emigre) Andrey Sinyavsky. Artist Mikhail Shemyakin, his new Paris friend (or a "bottle-sharer", in Vladi's terms), recorded Vysotsky in his home studio. After a brief stay in England Vysotsky crossed the ocean and made his first Mexican concerts in April. Back in Moscow, there were changes at Taganka: Lyubimov went to Milan's La Scala on a contract and Anatoly Efros has been brought in, a director of radically different approach. His project, Chekhov's The Cherry Orchard, caused a sensation. Critics praised Alla Demidova (as Ranevskaya) and Vysotsky (as Lopakhin) powerful interplay, some describing it as one of the most dazzling in the history of the Soviet theater. Lyubimov, who disliked the piece, accused Efros of giving his actors "the stardom malaise." The 1976 Taganka's visit to Bulgaria resulted in Vysotskys's interview there being filmed and 15 songs recorded by Balkanton record label. On return Lyubimov made a move which many thought outrageous: declaring himself "unable to work with this Mr. Vysotsky anymore" he gave the role of Hamlet to Valery Zolotukhin, the latter's best friend. That was the time, reportedly, when stressed out Vysotsky started taking amphetamines.

Another Belorussian voyage completed, Marina and Vladimir went for France and from there (without any official permission given, or asked for) flew to the North America. In New York Vysotsky met, among other people, Mikhail Baryshnikov and Joseph Brodsky. In a televised one-hour interview with Dan Rather he stressed he was "not a dissident, just an artist, who's never had any intentions to leave his country where people loved him and his songs." At home this unauthorized venture into the Western world bore no repercussions: by this time Soviet authorities were divided as regards the "Vysotsky controversy" up to the highest level; while Mikhail Suslov detested the bard, Brezhnev loved him to such an extent that once, while in hospital, asked him to perform live in his daughter Galina's home, listening to this concert on the telephone. In 1976 appeared "The Domes", "The Rope" and the "Medieval" cycle, including "The Ballad of Love".

In September Vysotsky with Taganka made a trip to Yugoslavia where Hamlet won the annual BITEF festival's first prize, and then to Hungary for a two-week concert tour. Back in Moscow Lyubimov's production of The Master & Margarita featured Vysotsky as Ivan Bezdomny; a modest role, somewhat recompensed by an important Svidrigailov slot in Yury Karyakin's take on Dostoevsky's Crime and Punishment. Vysotsky's new songs of this period include "The History of Illness" cycle concerning his health problems, humorous "Why Did the Savages Eat Captain Cook", the metaphorical "Ballad of the Truth and the Lie", as well as "Two Fates", the chilling story of a self-absorbed alcoholic hunted by two malevolent witches, his two-faced destiny. In 1977 Vysotsky's health deteriorated (heart, kidneys, liver failures, jaw infection and nervous breakdown) to such an extent that in April he found himself in Moscow clinic's reanimation center in the state of physical and mental collapse.

1977–1980 
In 1977 Vysotsky made an unlikely appearance in New York City on the American television show 60 Minutes, which falsely stated that Vysotsky had spent time in the Soviet prison system, the Gulag. That year saw the release of three Vysotsky's LPs in France (including the one that had been recorded by RCA in Canada the previous year); arranged and accompanied by guitarist Kostya Kazansky, the singer for the first time ever enjoyed the relatively sophisticated musical background. In August he performed in Hollywood before members of New York City film cast and (according to Vladi) was greeted warmly by the likes of Liza Minnelli and Robert De Niro. Some more concerts in Los Angeles were followed by the appearance at the French Communist paper L’Humanité annual event. In December Taganka left for France, its Hamlet (Vysotsky back in the lead) gaining fine reviews.

1978 started with the March–April series of concerts in Moscow and Ukraine. In May Vysotsky embarked upon a new major film project: The Meeting Place Cannot Be Changed (Место встречи изменить нельзя) about two detectives fighting crime in late 1940s Russia, directed by Stanislav Govorukhin. The film (premiered on 11 November 1978 on the Soviet Central TV) presented Vysotsky as Zheglov, a ruthless and charismatic cop teaching his milder partner Sharapov (actor Vladimir Konkin) his art of crime-solving. Vysotsky also became engaged in Taganka's Genre-seeking show (performing some of his own songs) and played Aleksander Blok in Anatoly Efros' The Lady Stranger (Незнакомка) radio play (premiered on air on 10 July 1979 and later released as a double LP).

In November 1978 Vysotsky took part in the underground censorship-defying literary project Metropolis, inspired and organized by Vasily Aksenov. In January 1979 Vysotsky again visited America with highly successful series of concerts. That was the point (according to biographer Vladimir Novikov) when a glimpse of new, clean life of a respectable international actor and performer all but made Vysotsky seriously reconsider his priorities. What followed though, was a return to the self-destructive theater and concert tours schedule, personal doctor Anatoly Fedotov now not only his companion, but part of Taganka's crew. "Who was this Anatoly? Just a man who in every possible situation would try to provide drugs. And he did provide. In such moments Volodya trusted him totally," Oksana Afanasyeva, Vysotsky's Moscow girlfriend (who was near him for most of the last year of his life and, on occasion, herself served as a drug courier) remembered. In July 1979, after a series of Central Asia concerts, Vysotsky collapsed, experienced clinical death and was resuscitated by Fedotov (who injected caffeine into the heart directly), colleague and close friend Vsevolod Abdulov helping with heart massage. In January 1980 Vysotsky asked Lyubimov for a year's leave. "Up to you, but on condition that Hamlet is yours," was the answer. The songwriting showed signs of slowing down, as Vysotsky began switching from songs to more conventional poetry. 
Still, of nearly 800 poems by Vysotsky only one has been published in the Soviet Union while he was alive. Not a single performance or interview was broadcast by the Soviet television in his lifetime.

In May 1979, being in a practice studio of the MSU Faculty of Journalism, Vysotsky recorded a video letter to American actor and film producer Warren Beatty, looking for both a personal meeting with Beatty and an opportunity to get a role in Reds film, to be produced and directed by the latter. While recording, Vysotsky made a few attempts to speak English, trying to overcome the language barrier. This video letter never reached Beatty. It was broadcast for the first time more than three decades later, on the night of 24 January 2013 (local time) by Rossiya 1 channel, along with records of TV channels of Italy, Mexico, Poland, USA and from private collections, in Vladimir Vysotsky. A letter to Warren Beatty film by Alexander Kovanovsky and Igor Rakhmanov. While recording this video, Vysotsky had a rare opportunity to perform for a camera, being still unable to do it with Soviet television.

On 22 January 1980, Vysotsky entered the Moscow Ostankino TV Center to record his one and only studio concert for the Soviet television. What proved to be an exhausting affair (his concentration lacking, he had to plod through several takes for each song) was premiered on the Soviet TV eight years later. The last six months of his life saw Vysotsky appearing on stage sporadically, fueled by heavy dosages of drugs and alcohol. His performances were often erratic. Occasionally Vysotsky paid visits to  institute's ER unit, but would not hear of Marina Vlady's suggestions for him to take long-term rehabilitation course in a Western clinic. Yet he kept writing, mostly poetry and even prose, but songs as well. The last song he performed was the agonizing "My Sorrow, My Anguish" and his final poem, written one week prior to his death was "A Letter to Marina": "I'm less than fifty, but the time is short / By you and God protected, life and limb / I have a song or two to sing before the Lord / I have a way to make my peace with him."

Death
Although several theories of the ultimate cause of the singer's death persist to this day, given what is now known about cardiovascular disease, it seems likely that by the time of his death Vysotsky had an advanced coronary condition brought about by years of tobacco, alcohol and drug abuse, as well as his grueling work schedule and the stress of the constant harassment by the government. Towards the end, most of Vysotsky's closest friends had become aware of the ominous signs and were convinced that his demise was only a matter of time. Clear evidence of this can be seen in a video ostensibly shot by the Japanese NHK channel only months before Vysotsky's death, where he appears visibly unwell, breathing heavily and slurring his speech. Accounts by Vysotsky's close friends and colleagues concerning his last hours were compiled in the book by V. Perevozchikov.

Vysotsky suffered from alcoholism for most of his life. Sometime around 1977, he started using amphetamines and other prescription narcotics in an attempt to counteract the debilitating hangovers and eventually to rid himself of alcohol addiction. While these attempts were partially successful, he ended up trading alcoholism for a severe drug dependency that was fast spiralling out of control. He was reduced to begging some of his close friends in the medical profession for supplies of drugs, often using his acting skills to collapse in a medical office and imitate a seizure or some other condition requiring a painkiller injection. On 25 July 1979 (a year to the day before his death) he suffered a cardiac arrest and was clinically dead for several minutes during a concert tour of Soviet Uzbekistan, after injecting himself with a wrong kind of painkiller he had previously obtained from a dentist's office.

Fully aware of the dangers of his condition, Vysotsky made several attempts to cure himself of his addiction. He underwent an experimental (and ultimately discredited) blood purification procedure offered by a leading drug rehabilitation specialist in Moscow. He also went to an isolated retreat in France with his wife Marina in the spring of 1980 as a way of forcefully depriving himself of any access to drugs. After these attempts failed, Vysotsky returned to Moscow to find his life in an increasingly stressful state of disarray. He had been a defendant in two criminal trials, one for a car wreck he had caused some months earlier, and one for an alleged conspiracy to sell unauthorized concert tickets (he eventually received a suspended sentence and a probation in the first case, and the charges in the second were dismissed, although several of his co-defendants were found guilty). He also unsuccessfully fought the film studio authorities for the rights to direct a movie called The Green Phaeton. Relations with his wife Marina were deteriorating, and he was torn between his loyalty to her and his love for his mistress Oksana Afanasyeva. He had also developed severe inflammation in one of his legs, making his concert performances extremely challenging.

In a final desperate attempt to overcome his drug addiction, partially prompted by his inability to obtain drugs through his usual channels (the authorities had imposed a strict monitoring of the medical institutions to prevent illicit drug distribution during the 1980 Olympics), he relapsed into alcohol and went on a prolonged drinking binge (apparently consuming copious amounts of champagne due to a prevalent misconception at the time that it was better than vodka at countering the effects of drug withdrawal).

On 3 July 1980, Vysotsky gave a performance at a suburban Moscow concert hall. One of the stage managers recalls that he looked visibly unhealthy ("gray-faced", as she puts it) and complained of not feeling too good, while another says she was surprised by his request for champagne before the start of the show, as he had always been known for completely abstaining from drink before his concerts. On 16 July Vysotsky gave his last public concert in Kaliningrad. On 18 July, Vysotsky played Hamlet for the last time at the Taganka Theatre. From around 21 July, several of his close friends were on a round-the-clock watch at his apartment, carefully monitoring his alcohol intake and hoping against all odds that his drug dependency would soon be overcome and they would then be able to bring him back from the brink. The effects of drug withdrawal were clearly getting the better of him, as he got increasingly restless, moaned and screamed in pain, and at times fell into memory lapses, failing to recognize at first some of his visitors, including his son Arkadiy. At one point, Vysotsky's personal physician A. Fedotov (the same doctor who had brought him back from clinical death a year earlier in Uzbekistan) attempted to sedate him, inadvertently causing asphyxiation from which he was barely saved. On 24 July, Vysotsky told his mother that he thought he was going to die that day, and then made similar remarks to a few of the friends present at the apartment, who begged him to stop such talk and keep his spirits up. But soon thereafter, Oksana Afanasyeva saw him clench his chest several times, which led her to suspect that he was genuinely suffering from a cardiovascular condition. She informed Fedotov of this but was told not to worry, as he was going to monitor Vysotsky's condition all night. In the evening, after drinking relatively small amounts of alcohol, the moaning and groaning Vysotsky was sedated by Fedotov, who then sat down on the couch next to him but fell asleep. Fedotov awoke in the early hours of 25 July to an unusual silence and found Vysotsky dead in his bed with his eyes wide open, apparently of a myocardial infarction, as he later certified. This was contradicted by Fedotov's colleagues, Sklifosovsky Emergency Medical Institute physicians L. Sul'povar and S. Scherbakov (who had demanded the actor's immediate hospitalization on 23 July but were allegedly rebuffed by Fedotov), who insisted that Fedotov's incompetent sedation combined with alcohol was what killed Vysotsky. An autopsy was prevented by Vysotsky's parents (who were eager to have their son's drug addiction remain secret), so the true cause of death remains unknown.

No official announcement of the actor's death was made, only a brief obituary appeared in the Moscow newspaper Vechernyaya Moskva, and a note informing of Vysotsky's death and cancellation of the Hamlet performance was put out at the entrance to the Taganka Theatre (the story goes that not a single ticket holder took advantage of the refund offer). Despite this, by the end of the day, millions had learned of Vysotsky's death. On 28 July, he lay in state at the Taganka Theatre. After a mourning ceremony involving an unauthorized mass gathering of unprecedented scale, Vysotsky was buried at the Vagankovskoye Cemetery in Moscow. The attendance at the Olympic events dropped noticeably on that day, as scores of spectators left to attend the funeral. Tens of thousands of people lined the streets to catch a glimpse of his coffin.

Controversy surrounding circumstances of death
According to author Valery Perevozchikov part of the blame for his death lay with the group of associates who surrounded him in the last years of his life. This inner circle were all people under the influence of his strong character, combined with a material interest in the large sums of money his concerts earned. This list included Valerii Yankelovich, manager of the Taganka Theatre and prime organiser of his non-sanctioned concerts; Anatoly Fedotov, his personal doctor; Vadim Tumanov, gold prospector (and personal friend) from Siberia; Oksana Afanasyeva (later Yarmolnik), his mistress the last three years of his life; Ivan Bortnik, a fellow actor; and Leonid Sul'povar, a department head at the Sklifosovski hospital who was responsible for much of the supply of drugs.

Vysotsky's associates had all put in efforts to supply his drug habit, which kept him going in the last years of his life. Under their influence, he was able to continue to perform all over the country, up to a week before his death. Due to illegal (i.e. non-state-sanctioned) sales of tickets and other underground methods, these concerts pulled in sums of money unimaginable in Soviet times, when almost everyone received nearly the same small salary. The payouts and gathering of money were a constant source of danger, and Yankelovich and others were needed to organise them.

Some money went to Vysotsky, the rest was distributed amongst this circle. At first this was a reasonable return on their efforts; however, as his addiction progressed and his body developed resistance, the frequency and amount of drugs needed to keep Vysotsky going became unmanageable. This culminated at the time of the Moscow Olympics which coincided with the last days of his life, when supplies of drugs were monitored more strictly than usual, and some of the doctors involved in supplying Vysotsky were already behind bars (normally the doctors had to account for every ampule, thus drugs were transferred to an empty container, while the patients received a substitute or placebo instead). In the last few days Vysotsky became uncontrollable, his shouting could be heard all over the apartment building on Malaya Gruzinskaya St. where he lived amongst VIP's. Several days before his death, in a state of stupor he went on a high speed drive around Moscow in an attempt to obtain drugs and alcohol – when many high-ranking people saw him. This increased the likelihood of him being forcibly admitted to the hospital, and the consequent danger to the circle supplying his habit. As his state of health declined, and it became obvious that he might die, his associates gathered to decide what to do with him. They came up with no firm decision. They did not want him admitted officially, as his drug addiction would become public and they would fall under suspicion, although some of them admitted that any ordinary person in his condition would have been admitted immediately.

On Vysotsky's death his associates and relatives put in much effort to prevent a post-mortem being carried out. This despite the fairly unusual circumstances: he died aged 42 under heavy sedation with an improvised cocktail of sedatives and stimulants, including the toxic chloral hydrate, provided by his personal doctor who had been supplying him with narcotics the previous three years. This doctor, being the only one present at his side when death occurred, had a few days earlier been seen to display elementary negligence in treating the sedated Vysotsky. On the night of his death, Arkadii Vysotsky (his son), who tried to visit his father in his apartment, was rudely refused entry by Yankelovich, even though there was a lack of people able to care for him. Subsequently, the Soviet police commenced a manslaughter investigation which was dropped due to the absence of evidence taken at the time of death.

Marriages
Vysotsky's first wife was Iza Zhukova. They met in 1956, being both MAT theater institute students, lived for some time at Vysotsky's mother's flat in Moscow, after her graduation (Iza was 2 years older) spent months in different cities (her – in Kiev, then Rostov) and finally married on 25 April 1960.

He met his second wife Lyudmila Abramova in 1961, while shooting the film 713 Requests Permission to Land. They married in 1965 and had two sons, Arkady (born 1962) and Nikita (born 1964).

While still married to Lyudmila Abramova, Vysotsky began a romantic relationship with Tatyana Ivanenko, a Taganka actress, then, in 1967 fell in love with Marina Vlady, a French actress of Russian descent, who was working at Mosfilm on a joint Soviet-French production at that time. Marina had been married before and had three children, while Vladimir had two. They were married in 1969. For 10 years the two maintained a long-distance relationship as Marina compromised her career in France to spend more time in Moscow, and Vladimir's friends pulled strings for him to be allowed to travel abroad to stay with his wife. Marina eventually joined the Communist Party of France, which essentially gave her an unlimited-entry visa into the Soviet Union, and provided Vladimir with some immunity against prosecution by the government, which was becoming weary of his covertly anti-Soviet lyrics and his odds-defying popularity with the masses. The problems of his long-distance relationship with Vlady inspired several of Vysotsky's songs.

Legacy and remembrance 

In the autumn of 1981 Vysotsky's first collection of poetry was officially published in the USSR, called The Nerve (Нерв). Its first edition (25,000 copies) was sold out instantly. In 1982 the second one followed (100,000), then the 3rd (1988, 200,000), followed in the 1990s by several more. The material for it was compiled by Robert Rozhdestvensky, an officially laurelled Soviet poet. Also in 1981 Yuri Lyubimov staged at Taganka a new music and poetry production called Vladimir Vysotsky which was promptly banned and officially premiered on 25 January 1989.

In 1982 the motion picture The Ballad of the Valiant Knight Ivanhoe was produced in the Soviet Union and in 1983 the movie was released to the public. Four songs by Vysotsky were featured in the film.

In 1986 the official Vysotsky poetic heritage committee was formed (with Robert Rozhdestvensky at the helm, theater critic Natalya Krymova being both the instigator and the organizer). Despite some opposition from the conservatives (Yegor Ligachev was the latter's political leader, Stanislav Kunyaev of Nash Sovremennik represented its literary flank) Vysotsky was rewarded posthumously with the USSR State Prize. The official formula – "for creating the character of Zheglov and artistic achievements as a singer-songwriter" was much derided from both the left and the right. In 1988 the Selected Works of... (edited by N. Krymova) compilation was published, preceded by I Will Surely Return... (Я, конечно, вернусь...) book of fellow actors' memoirs and Vysotsky's verses, some published for the first time. In 1990 two volumes of extensive The Works of... were published, financed by the late poet's father Semyon Vysotsky. Even more ambitious publication series, self-proclaimed "the first ever academical edition" (the latter assertion being dismissed by sceptics) compiled and edited by Sergey Zhiltsov, were published in Tula (1994–1998, 5 volumes), Germany (1994, 7 volumes) and Moscow (1997, 4 volumes).

In 1989 the official Vysotsky Museum opened in Moscow, with the magazine of its own called Vagant (edited by Sergey Zaitsev) devoted entirely to Vysotsky's legacy. In 1996 it became an independent publication and was closed in 2002.

In the years to come, Vysotsky's grave became a site of pilgrimage for several generations of his fans, the youngest of whom were born after his death. His tombstone also became the subject of controversy, as his widow had wished for a simple abstract slab, while his parents insisted on a realistic gilded statue. Although probably too solemn to have inspired Vysotsky himself, the statue is believed by some to be full of metaphors and symbols reminiscent of the singer's life.

In 1995 in Moscow the Vysotsky monument was officially opened at Strastnoy Boulevard, by the Petrovsky Gates. Among those present were the bard's parents, two of his sons, first wife Iza, renown poets Yevtushenko and Voznesensky. "Vysotsky had always been telling the truth. Only once he was wrong when he sang in one of his songs: 'They will never erect me a monument in a square like that by Petrovskye Vorota'", Mayor of Moscow Yuri Luzhkov said in his speech. A further monument to Vysotsky was erected in 2014 at Rostov-on-Don.

In October 2004, a monument to Vysotsky was erected in the Montenegrin capital of Podgorica, near the Millennium Bridge. His son, Nikita Vysotsky, attended the unveiling. The statue was designed by Russian sculptor Alexander Taratinov, who also designed a monument to Alexander Pushkin in Podgorica. The bronze statue shows Vysotsky standing on a pedestal, with his one hand raised and the other holding a guitar. Next to the figure lies a bronze skull – a reference to Vysotsky's monumental lead performances in Shakespeare's Hamlet. On the pedestal the last lines from a poem of Vysotsky's, dedicated to Montenegro, are carved.

The Vysotsky business center & semi-skyscraper was officially opened in Yekaterinburg, in 2011. It is the tallest building in Russia outside of Moscow, has 54 floors, total height: . On the third floor of the business center is the Vysotsky Museum. Behind the building is a bronze sculpture of Vladimir Vysotsky and his third wife, a French actress Marina Vlady.

In 2011 a controversial movie Vysotsky. Thank You For Being Alive was released, script written by his son, Nikita Vysotsky. The actor Sergey Bezrukov portrayed Vysotsky, using a combination of a mask and CGI effects. The film tells about Vysotsky's illegal underground performances, problems with KGB and drugs, and subsequent clinical death in 1979.

Shortly after Vysotsky's death, many Russian bards started writing songs and poems about his life and death. The best known are Yuri Vizbor's "Letter to Vysotsky" (1982) and Bulat Okudzhava's "About Volodya Vysotsky" (1980). In Poland, Jacek Kaczmarski based some of his songs on those of Vysotsky, such as his first song (1977) was based on  "The Wolfhunt", and dedicated to his memory the song "Epitafium dla Włodzimierza Wysockiego" ("Epitaph for Vladimir Vysotsky").

Every year on Vysotsky's birthday festivals are held throughout Russia and in many communities throughout the world, especially in Europe. Vysotsky's impact in Russia is often compared to that of Wolf Biermann in Germany, Bob Dylan in America, or Georges Brassens and Jacques Brel in France.

The asteroid 2374 Vladvysotskij, discovered by Lyudmila Zhuravleva, was named after Vysotsky.

During the Annual Q&A Event Direct Line with Vladimir Putin, Alexey Venediktov asked Putin to name a street in Moscow after the singer Vladimir Vysotsky, who, though considered one of the greatest Russian artists, has no street named after him in Moscow almost 30 years after his death. Venediktov stated a Russian law that allowed the President to do so and promote a law suggestion to name a street by decree. Putin answered that he would talk to Mayor of Moscow and would solve this problem. In July 2015 former Upper and Lower Tagansky Dead-ends (Верхний и Нижний Таганские тупики) in Moscow were reorganized into Vladimir Vysotsky Street.

The Sata Kieli Cultural Association, [Finland], organizes the annual International Vladimir Vysotsky Festival (Vysotski Fest), where Vysotsky's singers from different countries perform in Helsinki and other Finnish cities. They sing Vysotsky in different languages and in different arrangements.

Two brothers and singers from Finland, Mika and Turkka Mali, over the course of their more than 30-year musical career, have translated into Finnish, recorded and on numerous occasions publicly performed songs of Vladimir Vysotsky.

Throughout his lengthy musical career, Jaromír Nohavica, a famed Czech singer, translated and performed numerous songs of Vladimir Vysotsky, most notably Песня о друге (Píseň o příteli – Song about a friend).

The Museum of Vladimir Vysotsky in Koszalin dedicated to Vladimir Vysotsky was founded by Marlena Zimna (1969–2016) in May 1994, in her apartment, in the city of Koszalin, in Poland. Since then the museum has collected over 19,500 exhibits from different countries and currently holds Vladimir Vysotsky' personal items, autographs, drawings, letters, photographs and a large library containing unique film footage, vinyl records, CDs and DVDs. A special place in the collection holds a Vladimir Vysotsky's guitar, on which he played at a concert in Casablanca in April 1976. Vladimir Vysotsky presented this guitar to Moroccan journalist Hassan El-Sayed together with an autograph (an extract from Vladimir Vysotsky's song "What Happened in Africa"), written in Russian right on the guitar.

In January 2023, a monument to the outstanding actor, singer and poet Vladimir Vysotsky was unveiled in Yuzhno-Sakhalinsk, in the square near the Rodina House of Culture. Author Vladimir Chebotarev.

Books on Vladimir Vysotsky 
After her husband's death, urged by her friend Simone Signoret, Marina Vlady wrote a book called The Aborted Flight about her years together with Vysotsky. The book paid tribute to Vladimir's talent and rich persona, yet was uncompromising in its depiction of his addictions and the problems that they caused in their marriage. Written in French (and published in France in 1987), it was translated into Russian in tandem by Vlady and a professional translator and came out in 1989 in the USSR. Totally credible from the specialists' point of view, the book caused controversy, among other things, by shocking revelations about the difficult father-and-son relationship (or rather, the lack of any), implying that Vysotsky-senior (while his son was alive) was deeply ashamed of him and his songs which he deemed "anti-Soviet" and reported his own son to the KGB. Also in 1989 another important book of memoirs was published in the USSR, providing a bulk of priceless material for the host of future biographers, Alla Demidova's Vladimir Vysotsky, the One I Know and Love. Among other publications of note were Valery Zolotukhin's Vysotsky's Secret (2000), a series of Valery Perevozchikov's books (His Dying Hour, The Unknown Vysotsky and others) containing detailed accounts and interviews dealing with the bard's life's major controversies (the mystery surrounding his death, the truth behind Vysotsky Sr.'s alleged KGB reports, the true nature of Vladimir Vysotsky's relations with his mother Nina's second husband Georgy Bartosh etc.), Iza Zhukova's Short Happiness for a Lifetime and the late bard's sister-in-law Irena Vysotskaya's My Brother Vysotsky. The Beginnings (both 2005).

A group of enthusiasts has created a non-profit project – the mobile application "Vysotsky"

Music 
The multifaceted talent of Vysotsky is often described by the term "bard" (бард) that Vysotsky has never been enthusiastic about. He thought of himself mainly as an actor and poet rather than a singer, and once remarked, "I do not belong to what people call bards or minstrels or whatever." With the advent of portable tape-recorders in the Soviet Union, Vysotsky's music became available to the masses in the form of home-made reel-to-reel audio tape recordings (later on cassette tapes).

Vysotsky accompanied himself on a Russian seven-string guitar, with a raspy voice singing ballads of love, peace, war, everyday Soviet life and of the human condition. He was largely perceived as the voice of honesty, at times sarcastically jabbing at the Soviet government, which made him a target for surveillance and threats. In France, he has been compared with Georges Brassens; in Russia, however, he was more frequently compared with Joe Dassin, partly because they were the same age and died in the same year, although their ideologies, biographies, and musical styles are very different. Vysotsky's lyrics and style greatly influenced Jacek Kaczmarski, a Polish songwriter and singer who touched on similar themes.

The songsover 600 of themwere written about almost any imaginable theme. The earliest were blatnaya pesnya ("outlaw songs"). These songs were based either on the life of the common people in Moscow or on life in the crime people, sometimes in Gulag. Vysotsky slowly grew out of this phase and started singing more serious, though often satirical, songs. Many of these songs were about war. These war songs were not written to glorify war, but rather to expose the listener to the emotions of those in extreme, life-threatening situations. Most Soviet veterans would say that Vysotsky's war songs described the truth of war far more accurately than more official "patriotic" songs.

Nearly all of Vysotsky's songs are in the first person, although he is almost never the narrator. When singing his criminal songs, he would adopt the accent and intonation of a Moscow thief, and when singing war songs, he would sing from the point of view of a soldier. In many of his philosophical songs, he adopted the role of inanimate objects. This created some confusion about Vysotsky's background, especially during the early years when information could not be passed around very easily. Using his acting talent, the poet played his role so well that until told otherwise, many of his fans believed that he was, indeed, a criminal or war veteran. Vysotsky's father said that "War veterans thought the author of the songs to be one of them, as if he had participated in the war together with them." The same could be said about mountain climbers; on multiple occasions, Vysotsky was sent pictures of mountain climbers' graves with quotes from his lyrics etched on the tombstones.

Not being officially recognized as a poet and singer, Vysotsky performed wherever and whenever he couldin the theater (where he worked), at universities, in private apartments, village clubs, and in the open air. It was not unusual for him to give several concerts in one day. He used to sleep little, using the night hours to write. With few exceptions, he wasn't allowed to publish his recordings with "Melodiya", which held a monopoly on the Soviet music industry. His songs were passed on through amateur, fairly low quality recordings on vinyl discs and magnetic tape, resulting in his immense popularity. Cosmonauts even took his music on cassette into orbit.

Musical style
Musically, virtually all of Vysotsky's songs were written in a minor key, and tended to employ from three to seven chords. Vysotsky composed his songs and played them exclusively on the Russian seven string guitar, often tuned a tone or a tone-and-a-half below the traditional Russian "Open G major" tuning. This guitar, with its specific Russian tuning, makes a slight yet notable difference in chord voicings than the standard tuned six string Spanish (classical) guitar, and it became a staple of his sound. Because Vysotsky tuned down a tone and a half, his strings had less tension, which also colored the sound.

His earliest songs were usually written in C minor (with the guitar tuned a tone down from DGBDGBD to CFACFAC), using the following chord shapes:

Songs written in this key include "Stars" (Zvyozdy), "My friend left for Magadan" (Moy drug uyekhal v Magadan), and most of his "outlaw songs".

At around 1970, Vysotsky began writing and playing exclusively in A minor (guitar tuned to CFACFAC), which he continued doing until his death. The main chord shapes he based his songs on were:

Vysotsky used his fingers instead of a pick to pluck and strum, as was the tradition with Russian guitar playing. He used a variety of finger picking and strumming techniques. One of his favorite was to play an alternating bass with his thumb as he plucked or strummed with his other fingers.

Often, Vysotsky would neglect to check the tuning of his guitar, which is particularly noticeable on earlier recordings. According to some accounts, Vysotsky would get upset when friends would attempt to tune his guitar, leading some to believe that he preferred to play slightly out of tune as a stylistic choice. Much of this is also attributable to the fact that a guitar that is tuned down more than 1 whole step (Vysotsky would sometimes tune as much as 2 and a half steps down) is prone to intonation problems.

Singing style 
Vysotsky had a unique singing style. He had an unusual habit of elongating consonants instead of vowels in his songs. So when a syllable is sung for a prolonged period of time, he would elongate the consonant instead of the vowel in that syllable.

Filmography

1959: The Yearlings (Сверстницы) (Mosfilm, Director: Vasiliy Ordynsky)
1961: Dima Gorin's Career (Карьера Димы Горина) (Maksim Gorky Studio, Director: Frunze Dovlatyan & Lev Mirsky) as Sofron
1962: 713 Requests Permission to Land (713-й просит посадку) (Lenfilm, Director: Grigory Nikulin) as an American sailor
1962: Shore Leave (Увольнение на берег) (Mosfilm, Director: Feliks Mironer) as Pyotr
1962: Greshnitsa (Director: Gavriil Egiazarov and Fyodor Filippov)
1963: Penalty Kick (Штрафной удар) (Maksim Gorky Studio, Director: Veniamin Dorman) as Aleksandr Nikulin
1964: The Alive and the Dead (Живые и мёртвые) (Mosfilm, Director: Aleksandr Stolper)
1965: Our House (Наш дом) (Mosfilm, Director: Vasily Pronin) as Mechanic
1965: On Tomorrow's Street (На завтрашней улице) (Mosfilm, Director: Fyodor Filipov) as Pyotr Markin
1965: The Cook (Стряпуха) (Mosfilm, Director: Edmond Keosayan)
1966: Stryapukha (Director: Edmond Keosayan)
1966: I Was Born in Childhood (Я родом из детства) (Belarusfilm, Director: Viktor Turov)
1966: Vertical (Вертикаль) (Odessa Film Studio, Director: Stanislav Govorukhin and Boris Durov) as Volodya, the radio operator
1966: Sasha-Sashen'ka (Саша-Сашенька) (Belarusfilm, Director: Vitaly Chetverikov) as Singer with Guitar (uncredited)
1967: Brief Encounters (Короткие встречи) (Odessa Film Studio, Director: Kira Muratova) as Maksim
1967: War Under the Rooftops (Война под крышами) (Belarusfilm, Director: Victor Turov)
1968: Two Comrades Were Serving (Служили два товарища) (Mosfilm, Director: Yevgeny Karelov) as Alexander Brusentsov
1968: Intervention (Интервенция) (Lenfilm, Director: Gennadi Poloka) as Michel Voronov / Brodsky
1969: Taiga's Master (Хозяин тайги) (Mosfilm, Director: Vladimir Nazarov)
1969: Dangerous Tour (Опасные гастроли) (Odessa Film Studio; Director: Georgi Yungvald-Khilkevich) as George Bengalsky
1969: White Blast (Белый взрыв) (Odessa Film Studio, Director: Stanislav Govorukhin) as Kapitan
1973: The Fourth (Четвёртый) – Mosfilm; Director: Alexandr Stolper
1973: The Bad Good Man (Плохой хороший человек) (Lenfilm, Director: Iosif Kheifits) as Von Koren
1975: The Only Road (Единственная дорога) (Mosfilm & Titograd Studio, Director: Vladimir Pavlovich) as Sofer Solodov
1975: Kontrabanda (Director: Stanislav Govorukhin) (singing voice)
1975: The Flight of Mr. McKinley (Бегство мистера Мак-Кинли) (Mosfilm, Director: Mikhail Schweitzer) as Bill Siger, a singer
1976: The Only One (Единственная) (Lenfilm, Director: Iosif Heifits) as Boris Ilyich, muzikalno-khorovogo kruzhka
1976: How Czar Peter the Great Married Off His Moor (Сказ про то, как царь Пётр арапа женил) (Mosfilm, Director: Alexander Mitta) as Ibragim
1976: 72 gradusa nizhe nulya (Director: Sergei Danilin and Yevgeni Tatarsky) (singing voice)
1977: They're Together (Они вдвоём) (Mafilm, Director: Márta Mészáros)
1979: The Meeting Place Cannot Be Changed (Место встречи изменить нельзя) (TV Mini-Series, Director: Stanislav Govorukhin) as Gleb Zheglov
1979: Little Tragedies (Маленькие трагедии) (TV Mini-Series, Director: Mikhail Schveytser) as Don Juan (final appearance)

Bibliography
 Wladimir Wyssozki. Aufbau Verlag 1989 (DDR): Zerreißt mir nicht meine silbernen Saiten....
 Vysotsky, Vladimir (1990): Hamlet With a Guitar. Moscow, Progress Publishers. 
 Vysotsky, Vladimir (2003):  Songs, Poems, Prose. Moscow, Eksmo. ISBN
 Vysotsky, Vladimir / Mer, Nathan (trans) (1991): Songs & Poems. 
 Vysotsky, Vladimir (1991): I Love, Therefore I Live. 
 Vlady, Marina (1987): Vladimir ou Le Vol Arrêté. Paris, Ed. Fayard.  (Vladimir or the Aborted Flight)
 Влади М. Владимир, или Прерванный полет. М.: Прогресс, 1989.
 Vlady, Marina / Meinert, Joachim (transl) (1991): Eine Liebe zwischen zwei Welten. Mein Leben mit Wladimir Wyssozki. Weimar, Aufbau Verlag. ISBN

Other books
 Novel about Girls (Roman o devochkah)
 Vacation in Vienna (Venskie kanikulyi)

Discography

Lifetime 
 Selected songs Melodiya, 1974
 Tightrope (Натянутый канат), PolyGram, 1977
 Алиса в стране чудес / Alice in Wonderland (1976) [2 vinyls]. Musical play, an adaptation of Alice in Wonderland, with Klara Rumyanova, Vladimir Vysotsky, Vsevolod Abdulov. Lyrics and music by Vladimir Vysotsky

Posthumous releases

Bulgaria 
 Автопортрет / Self-Portrait (1981) [12" vinyl] [LP] Balkanton

France 
 Le Monument (1995) [CD]
 Le Vol Arrêté (2000) [CD]

Germany 
 Wir drehen die Erde (1993) [CD]
 Lieder vom Krieg (1995) [CD]

Russia 
 Песни / Songs (1980) [LP] Melodiya
 Collection of songs published shortly after his death. [Melodiya Stereo C60-14761.2]
 Sons Are Leaving For Battle (1987) [double LP] Melodiya
 War songs. Archive recordings from between 1960 and 1980. [Melodiya MONO M60 47429 008/006]
 На концертах Владимира Высоцкого / At Vladimir Vysotsky's concerts
 01, 02, 03, ... 21 (1986–1990) [12" vinyl]

 Marina Vlady and Vladimir Vysotsky (1996) [CD] [Melodiya]
 Vysotsky On Compact Cassettes – 30 individual cassettes in total, also sold as a box set (1996) [Aprelevka Sound Production]
 MP3 Kollektsiya: Vladimir Vysotsky [SoLyd Records] Concert and Studio recordings, (period 1979–1980) (2002) [CD: MP3 192 kbit/s]
 Disk 1, 
 Disk 2, 
 Disk 3
 Disk 4
 Platinovaya Kollektsiya: Vladimir Vysotsky (2003) [2 CDs]: CD 1, CD 2

See also
Russian traditional music
Museum of Vladimir Vysotsky in Koszalin

References

Cited sources

External links

English sources 

 
 
 Vladimir Vysotsky's songs translated into English
 Vladimir Vysotsky. Songs in English, covered by a native English-speaker (Youtube)
 
 Eugenia Weinstein (private site, with English translation of some songs)
 Vladimir Vysotsky – Speaking In Tongues, Collected Poems (Songs) by Vladimir Vysotsky. Bilingual Version. Translated from the Russian by Alec Vagapov
 Vysotsky's father: "This Is What Our Son Was Like" – Speaking In Tongues
 My Life on Stage (autobiographical reminiscences) – Speaking In Tongues
 V. Vysotsky. The Monument. English translations
 Another Biography of Vladimir Vysotsky
 Vladimir Vysotsky in different tongues
 Poems and songs of Vladimir Vysotsky in the traditional Russian and English languages
 
 "Hey, Driver" by Vladimir Vysotsky. Bi-lingual edition. English translation by Andrew Glikin-Gusinsky
 Prose poem "Rafts" by Vladimir Vysotsky. English translation by Andrew Glikin-Gusinsky

Russian sources 
  Mobile application "Vysotsky"
  bards.ru (lyrics to most of his songs)
  vysotsky.km.ru (scores of photographs, a wealth of information)
  vv.uka.ru ("fonoteka": most of his songs in MP3 format)
  zeuhl.academ.org (Another source for MP3 files)
  zipsites.ru (Over 900 MP3 files from 32 disk box set)
  Nikita Vysotsky, Vladimir's son talks to AIF.
  Vysotsky and Pushkin together
  Truth of the moment of death V. K. Perevozchikov. Pravda Smertnogo Chasa:
  smotry-film.ru (Over 90 film files)
   Vladimir Vysotsky. 1980. Moscow. Sampo, 1998. 272 p.

1938 births
1980 deaths
 
Soviet male actors
Soviet musicians
Soviet singer-songwriters
Soviet male film actors
Soviet male stage actors
Soviet male singer-songwriters
Seven-string guitarists
Recipients of the USSR State Prize
Russian bards
Russian-language poets
Russian male film actors
Russian male singer-songwriters
Male actors from Moscow
Singers from Moscow
Writers from Moscow
Burials at Vagankovo Cemetery
20th-century guitarists
20th-century Russian musicians
20th-century Russian male actors
20th-century Russian male singers
20th-century Russian writers
20th-century Russian singers
Moscow Art Theatre School alumni